Simon Goddard (born Cardiff, 21 December 1971) is a British author and music journalist.

He was born in Wales, later moving to Scotland. Though a writer by profession, Goddard originally went to art school in Carlisle, then Hull, and briefly considered a career in visual media. In 1995 he directed his one and only pop promo for Edwyn Collins (the subject of one of his future books, Simply Thrilled). He started freelance writing the following year and eventually found regular work as a music journalist in London. 

His first two books, Songs That Saved Your Life and Mozipedia, established his initial reputation in the ‘00s as an authority on The Smiths and their former lead singer Morrissey. The latter was voted Book Of The Year by readers of Mojo magazine and has since been published in America by Plume, and in Brazil by Leya. Since 2010 Goddard's writing style and choice of subjects has greatly diversified, including the first biography of Postcard Records (Simply Thrilled, 2014), a picaresque homage to The Rolling Stones (Rollaresque, 2015), and 2018’s novelistic The Comeback telling the story of Elvis Presley and his 1968 Comeback Special. The latter made both Q and Mojo magazines' Music Books Of The Year lists. 

In 2020 he began his Bowie Odyssey series with Omnibus Press, chronicling the life of David Bowie against the cultural and social history of the 1970s, year-by-year. The first, Bowie Odyssey 70, was a Sunday Times Music Book Of The Year. The fourth in the series, Bowie Odyssey 73, will be published in May 2023.

As a freelance journalist, his work has appeared in Uncut, Mojo, Record Collector and newspapers including The Guardian and The Mail On Sunday.  
In 2006 he joined Q magazine where he remained a Contributing Editor until it ceased publication in July 2020. Goddard has also supplied the accompanying essays to rock photographer Tom Sheehan's collection The Cure: Pictures Of You (a 2022 Rough Trade Book Of The Year) and written sleevenotes for reissues and boxsets by Orange Juice, Siouxsie and The Banshees, Nico, Soft Cell and James.

Works
 Songs That Saved Your Life  —  The Art of The Smiths 1982-87, (2002; revised edition 2013, Titan Books)
 Mozipedia  —  The Encyclopedia of Morrissey and The Smiths, (2009, Ebury Press)
 Ziggyology —  A Brief History of Ziggy Stardust, (2013, Ebury Press)
 Simply Thrilled  —  The Preposterous Story of Postcard Records, (2014, Ebury Press)
 Rollaresque  —  (Or) The Rakish Progress of The Rolling Stones, (2015, Ebury Press)
 The Comeback  —  Elvis and the Story of the 68 Special, (2018, Omnibus Press)
 Bowie Odyssey 70 (2020, Omnibus Press)
 Bowie Odyssey 71 (2021, Omnibus Press)
 Bowie Odyssey 72 (2022, Omnibus Press)
 Bowie Odyssey 73 (2023, Omnibus Press)

References

British male journalists
Living people
1971 births